The Brandon Gonez Show is a weekly online talk show, which debuted on January 17, 2021, on YouTube. The show is anchored by Canadian television personality Brandon Gonez, and focuses on national news stories in Canada covering political, social and entertainment topics. The kick off to the show was attended by Tessa Virtue, John Tory, Jagmeet Singh and other personalities.

The show was created by Brandon Gonez who had previously worked at local stations in Canada like CFTK-TV and CFRE-DT. In 2017, Gonez began co-hosting the CTV national morning show Your Morning, but moved to the local Toronto station CP24 in 2019.

In January 2023, Gonez announced the acquisition of Now, a Toronto alternative weekly newspaper, following the bankruptcy of its prior parent corporation.

References

External links 

 Official Website

Canadian online journalism
English-language YouTube channels
Canadian non-fiction web series